South Korea (IOC designation:Korea) participated in the 1986 Asian Winter Games held in Sapporo, Japan from March 1 to 8, 1986.

Medal summary

Medal table

Medalists

Demonstration sport

Participation details

Alpine skiing
Men

Women

Notes
1: In men's Giant Slalom competition, Park Jae-hyuk was awarded third place on the rule that no country may win all the three medals. He ranked 5th originally but 1st–4th ranked athletes are same country.

Biathlon
Men (all 6 athletes)

Cross-country skiing
Men

Notes
1: In men's 30 km classical competition, Jeon Young-hae awarded 3rd place on the rules that no country may win all the three medals.

Figure skating
 Jung Sung-il - 4th in men's singles

Ice hockey
Men

Short-track speed skating
Men

Women

Notes
1: In men's 3000 m competition, Na Woon-seob awarded 3rd place on the rules that no country may win all the three medals.

Speed skating
Men

Women

Notes
1: In men's 1500 metres competition, Hwang Ik-hwan awarded 3rd place on the rules that no country may win all the three medals.

References

Nations at the 1986 Asian Winter Games
Asian Winter Games
South Korea at the Asian Winter Games